Richard Barrington (born 24 September 1990) is an English professional rugby union player. He plays at prop for Saracens. It was announced on 23 May 2022 that he would leave for French Pro D2 club, Agen at the end of the 2021/22 season.

During his time at Saracens he won four Premiership titles in 2015, 2016, 2018 and 2019, with Barrington featuring in all four finals. He also helped Saracens win the European Champions Cup in 2016, 2017 and 2019, though missed the 2017 final through injury. He will remain at Saracens until at least 2022.

References

External links
Premiership Rugby Profile
European Professional Club Rugby Profile
Saracens Profile

English rugby union players
Saracens F.C. players
Living people
1989 births
Rugby union props
Rugby union players from Gloucester